Maria Poiani Panigati (born 17 March 1982) is a former Italian Paralympic swimmer who competed in freestyle swimming events in international level events. She was a Paralympic champion in the 50m freestyle S11 at the 2008 Summer Paralympics.

References

1982 births
Living people
Sportspeople from Pavia
Paralympic swimmers of Italy
Italian female freestyle swimmers
Swimmers at the 2008 Summer Paralympics
Medalists at the 2008 Summer Paralympics
Paralympic medalists in swimming
Paralympic gold medalists for Italy
S11-classified Paralympic swimmers
21st-century Italian women